Donald McDonald Dickinson (January 17, 1846 – October 15, 1917) was a lawyer and politician from the U.S. state of Michigan.

Biography
Dickinson was born in The town of Richland, Oswego County, New York, on January 17, 1846, the son of Asa Case Dickinson and his wife Minerva holmes.  He later moved with his family to Michigan when he was two years old. He graduated from the University of Michigan Law School in 1867 and built a very successful practice in Detroit, frequently arguing cases before the Supreme Court of the United States.

In 1872, Dickinson established himself in state politics by working to effectively organize the Democratic Party in what at the time was a heavily Republican state. He was a member of Democratic National Committee from Michigan 1880–1885, and was an early supporter of the candidacy of Grover Cleveland for President in 1884. After election, Cleveland offered Dickinson a position on the recently created Civil Service Commission, but he declined. However, in 1887, Dickinson accepted the appointment as United States Postmaster General, serving from January 6, 1888, until the end of Cleveland's first term in 1889. A railroad strike soon after Dickinson took office interrupted postal service in the nation. Dickinson refused to use federal forces to break the strike and instead modified the distribution routes so that postal deliveries could continue. At Cleveland's request, Dickinson applied civil service reforms to hiring practices to minimize the effect of patronage on the postal service.

Following Cleveland's defeat, Dickinson returned to the practice of law in Detroit. He subsequently headed Michigan's delegation to the 1892 Democratic National Convention which renominated Cleveland. Dickinson split with the Democratic Party over William Jennings Bryan ascendancy and his monetary proposals. Dickinson support the Republican ticket of William McKinley and Theodore Roosevelt in 1900 and also supported Roosevelt's unsuccessful run as a third party candidate in 1912.

He died in Detroit on October 15, 1917, and is interred at Elmwood Cemetery. Dickinson County, Michigan, is named for him.

Notes

References
Donald M. Dickinson at American President

1846 births
1917 deaths
Burials at Elmwood Cemetery (Detroit)
United States Postmasters General
University of Michigan Law School alumni
People from Oswego County, New York
Lawyers from Detroit
Cleveland administration cabinet members
19th-century American politicians